The Koolhoven F.K.56 was a 1930s Dutch basic training monoplane designed and built by Koolhoven.

Development
The F.K.56 was a low-wing monoplane powered by a 450 hp (336 kW) Wright Whirlwind R-975-E3 radial piston engine. Designed as a basic trainer, the F.K.56 had two seats in tandem for the instructor and pupil under a fully enclosed canopy. The first prototype flew on 30 June 1938 and had fixed conventional landing gear and an inverted gull wing. The second prototype had retractable landing gear while a third prototype was fitted with a straight wing and dual controls.

Ten aircraft were ordered by the Netherlands Army based on the design of the third prototype. These ten, including the re-worked first and third prototypes, were all delivered before the German invasion of the Netherlands in May 1940.

Earlier in February 1940 the Belgians had ordered twenty F.K.56 basic trainers and seven had been delivered before the rest were destroyed in an air raid on the Waalhaven factory.

Operators

Belgian Air Force

Specifications

References

Notes

Bibliography

FK56
1930s Dutch military trainer aircraft